Steven Monkhouse (born 24 November 1962) is a former English cricketer. Monkhouse was a right-handed batsman who bowled left-arm fast-medium. He was born in Bury, Lancashire.

Monkhouse made his debut in county cricket for Warwickshire in a first-class match against Surrey in the County Championship. He made a further first-class appearance the following season against Lancashire in the 1986 County Championship. He took 2 wickets in his 2 matches, at 47.50 a piece. He joined Glamorgan in 1987, making his first-class debut for the county against Oxford University. He made 7 further first-class appearances for Glamorgan, the last of which came against Yorkshire in the 1988 County Championship. In his 8 first-class matches, he took 16 wickets at a respectable average of 30.06, with best figures of 3/37. It was for Glamorgan that he made his List A debut in the 1987 Refuge Assurance League against Northamptonshire. He made 3 further List A appearances for Glamorgan, all coming in 1987, with his final appearance coming against Hampshire. In his 4 limited-overs appearances for the county, he took 8 wickets at an average of 11.62, with best figures of 5/32. His best bowling figures came against Cheshire in the 1987 NatWest Trophy.

Leaving Glamorgan at the end of the 1988 season, Monkhouse later made a single List A appearance for Staffordshire against Glamorgan in the 1989 NatWest Trophy. In this match, he was dismissed for 11 runs by Michael Cann, while with the ball he bowled 12 wicket-less overs for the cost of 66 runs. He never appeared in Minor counties cricket for Staffordshire.

References

External links
Steve Monkhouse at ESPNcricinfo
Steve Monkhouse at CricketArchive

1962 births
Living people
Cricketers from Bury, Greater Manchester
English cricketers
Warwickshire cricketers
Glamorgan cricketers
Staffordshire cricketers